Lycée Français International may refer to:
Lycée Français International Marcel Pagnol (Asunción)
Lycée Français International de Bangkok
Lycée Français International de Pekin (Beijing)
Lycée Français International de Dubaï
Lycée Français International Victor Segalen (Hong Kong)
Lycée Français International de Tokyo